Natalia Saratovtseva is a former Russian football defender, also represented Azerbaijan. She played for various clubs in Russia including Rossiyanka in the Russian Championship.

As an Under-19 international, she played the 2006 U-19 European Championship for Russia. However, she subsequently decided to play for Azerbaijan as a senior international.

References

1989 births
Living people
Russian women's footballers
Azerbaijani women's footballers
Azerbaijan women's international footballers
Nadezhda Noginsk players
FC Energy Voronezh players
Women's association football defenders
Russian emigrants to Azerbaijan
Naturalized citizens of Azerbaijan